Hurricane is a 1929 American adventure film directed by Ralph Ince and starring Hobart Bosworth,  Johnny Mack Brown and Leila Hyams.

Synopsis
A group of pirates are stranded on a South Sea Island. They plot to seize another ship and its cargo in order to escape.

Cast
 Hobart Bosworth as Hurricane Martin  
 Johnny Mack Brown as Dan  
 Leila Hyams as Mary Stevens  
 Alan Roscoe as Captain Black  
 Tom O'Brien as Dugan  
 Leila McIntyre as Mrs. Stevens  
 Joe Bordeaux as Pete  
 Eddy Chandler as Bull

References

Bibliography
 Quinlan, David. The Illustrated Guide to Film Directors. Batsford, 1983.

External links

1929 films
Films directed by Ralph Ince
1920s English-language films
American black-and-white films
Columbia Pictures films
Seafaring films
American adventure films
1929 adventure films
1920s American films